The 1942 Richmond Spiders football team was an American football team that represented the University of Richmond as a member of the Southern Conference (SoCon) during the 1942 college football season. In their first season under head coach John Fenlon, Richmond compiled a 3–6–1 record, with a mark of 1–5 in conference play, finishing in 15th place in the SoCon.

Schedule

References

Richmond
Richmond Spiders football seasons
Richmond Spiders football